Annabella (born Suzanne Georgette Charpentier, 14 July 1907 – 18 September 1996) was a French cinema actress who appeared in 46 films between 1927 and 1952, including some Hollywood films during the late 1930s and 1940s.

Life and career
Annabella was born in Paris, France. Annabella's chance to enter films came when her father entertained a film producer, who gave her a small part in Abel Gance's great classic Napoléon (1927). She was not critically acclaimed until she starred in René Clair's Le Million (1931), and over the following decade established herself as one of France's most popular cinema actresses. For Veille d'armes (1935), she won the Volpi Cup for Best Actress at the Venice Film Festival in 1936.

She was cast as the female lead in the British-made film Wings of the Morning (1937) with Henry Fonda. Under contract to 20th Century Fox, she traveled to America and appeared in Suez (1938) with Loretta Young and Tyrone Power. Her romance with Power was widely reported by movie magazines of the day. Darryl F. Zanuck, movie mogul at 20th Century Fox, did not want his matinee idol married. He offered Annabella a multi-movie deal that would take her overseas. She refused to leave Power, and on completion of Suez, she returned to France to obtain a divorce from her then-husband, Jean Murat. Power and she married on 23 April 1939. The two honeymooned in Rome. Within a few months, Annabella and Power had again flown to Europe to bring Annabella's mother back to live in their home, while her father and brother stayed behind. Her brother was ultimately shot and killed by the Nazis. Annabella made a return trip to bring her daughter, Anne, back from France to live with them. Power adopted Anne before leaving for service in the United States Marine Corps in August 1942. Anne Power later married actor Oskar Werner.

Darryl F. Zanuck, angry with her for marrying his top box-office star, did not cast her in movies despite Annabella's contract with 20th Century-Fox. Annabella was also not lent to other studios. Power and she appeared together in the play Liliom in New Haven, Connecticut. While Power was away during his war service, Annabella appeared in Blithe Spirit in Chicago. On Broadway, she received excellent notices for her work in the play Jacobowsky and the Colonel, directed by Elia Kazan, in 1944. Annabella also embarked on an affair with author Roald Dahl; she had refused to give Power a divorce to marry Judy Garland, and her marriage was strained. Dahl told his wife, Liccy, that it was an intense and passionate relationship, during which Dahl learned a lot about sex from the actress.

When Power returned from the war, the couple decided to try to make their marriage work once again.

Annabella again worked in films, playing the female lead in 13 Rue Madeleine (1947) with James Cagney.  Power and she finally divorced in 1948, and Annabella returned to France. She appeared in film director José Luis Sáenz de Heredia's Spanish version of Don Juan (1950), and her final film was released in 1952. After a 1954 television appearance in the American series Suspense, she retired.

Annabella and Tyrone Power remained very close, and after his divorce from Linda Christian, he attempted to reconcile with her, confessing that in giving her up, he had made a terrible mistake. However, Annabella refused. Power informed her that he would not take the elevator to leave her apartment, but the stairs, in case she changed her mind and called him back. She did not.

Annabella died in 1996 after suffering a heart attack in Neuilly-sur-Seine, France, aged 89, and was interred in Passy Cemetery in Haute-Savoie (France).

Filmography

References

External links

Photographs and literature
Annabella web site

1907 births
1996 deaths
People from Val-de-Marne
French film actresses
French silent film actresses
Burials at Passy Cemetery
Volpi Cup for Best Actress winners
20th-century French actresses
Power family
French expatriate actresses in the United States